

Competitions

Overview

Egyptian Premier League

League table

 (C)= Champions, (R)= Relegated, Pld = Matches played; W = Matches won; D = Matches drawn; L = Matches lost; F = Goals for; A = Goals against; ± = Goal difference; Pts = Points.

Matches

Egypt Cup

Friendly matches

References

Al Ahly SC seasons
Egyptian football clubs 1961–62 season
1961–62 in African association football leagues